Pincher Creek was a provincial electoral district in Alberta, Canada, mandated to return a single member to the Legislative Assembly of Alberta from 1905 to 1940.

History

The Pincher Creek electoral district was founded as one of the original 25 electoral districts contested in the 1905 Alberta general election upon Alberta joining Confederation in September 1905.

The Pincher Creek electoral district was abolished prior to the 1940 Alberta general election and the territory was redistributed into the Pincher Creek-Crowsnest and Cardston electoral districts.

Electoral history
The first general election held in the Pincher Creek electoral district turned into a hotly contested four way race. Large portions of the population worked as coal miners in the mountains while the foothills provided prime land for cattle ranching.

Former Mayor of Town of Pincher Creek R. O. Allison would unsuccessful contest the 1926 and 1935 Alberta general elections.

Election results

1905 general election

The Returning Officer for the election was James H. Schofield. 
The provincial Liberal candidate in the election was local rancher John Marcellus. The provincial Conservatives ran John Kemmis. The third party candidate in the race was Frank Sherman who stood as a Labor candidate representing the United Mine Workers Union. Rounding out the field was Independent candidate Charles Kettles. Kettles was well known for founding the Pincher Creek townsite in 1882 when he worked for the North-West Mounted Police and served as a Department of Indian Affairs employee. He also ran a grocery store C. Kettles & Co. He dropped out of the race in time to have his name stricken off the ballot.

On election night the race between Marcellus and Sherman seesawed back and forth. At one time during the night Marcellus had conceded his defeat as Sherman pulled ahead in first place. However the election turned as the final polls brought in favorable results for Marcellus leading him to a close victory. Kemmis ran a close third through the evening.

1909 general election

1911 by-election

1913 general election

1917 general election

1921 general election

1926 general election

1930 general election

1935 general election

See also
List of Alberta provincial electoral districts
Pincher Creek, Alberta, a town in southern Alberta, Canada

References

Further reading

External links
Elections Alberta
The Legislative Assembly of Alberta

Former provincial electoral districts of Alberta